The Universidad Autónoma de Durango (Autonomous University of Durango or Universidad Durango Santander or UAD) is a private university with its main campus located in Durango City, Durango and with campuses in multiple Mexican states. It was founded on 11 February 1992 and is operated by the Fomento Educativo y Cultural Francisco de Ibarra, A.C. 

The university serves some 16,000 students on its own at high school, undergraduate and postgraduate level and offers distance learning. The university also offers bilingual (English and Spanish) education from kindergarten to high school with Colegio de Inglés.

Programs
UAD offers full-time studies courses, part-time study courses, online distance learning and Saturday and evening courses. The degrees can be on a quarter or semester system. Postgraduate courses are on a semester system, and are offered only on the weekends.

The following are the undergraduate and graduate degrees taught by the university in its different campuses. The educational courses offered varies in each campus:

Undergraduate Degrees

Graduate Degrees
Finance
Geriatrics
Law
Judicial Public Speaking
Real Estate Valuation
Senior Management and Business Management
Tax Law

Doctorate Degrees
Constitutional, Criminal and Protection Law
Education
Management

List of campuses throughout Mexico

Media
UAD operates the Lobos FM radio network, with stations at Durango, Gómez Palacio, Mazatlán, Hermosillo, Los Mochis, Zacatecas and Culiacán. In addition, UAD operates a television station in Durango, XHUAD-TDT channel 4.

References

Universities and colleges in Aguascalientes
Universities and colleges in Baja California
Universities and colleges in Chihuahua (state)
Universities and colleges in Coahuila
Universities and colleges in Durango
Education in Hidalgo (state)
Universities and colleges in Michoacán
Universities and colleges in Nuevo León
Universities and colleges in Querétaro
Universities and colleges in Sinaloa
Universities and colleges in Sonora
Universities and colleges in Zacatecas
Durango City
Educational institutions established in 1992
1992 establishments in Mexico
Private universities and colleges in Mexico